A wilayah ( or wilāya, plural ; Urdu and , velâyat) is an administrative division, usually translated as "state", "province" or occasionally as "governorate". The word comes from the Arabic root "w-l-y", "to govern": a wāli—"governor"—governs a wālāya (or wilāya), "that which is governed". Under the Caliphate, the term referred to any constituent near-sovereign state.

Use in specific countries
In Arabic, wilayah is used to refer to the states of the United States, and the United States of America as a whole is called al-Wilāyāt al-Muttaḥidah al-Amrīkīyah, literally meaning "the American United States".

North Africa and Middle East
For Morocco, which is divided into provinces and wilāyas, the translation "province" would cause the distinction to cease. For Sudan, the term state and for Mauritania, the term region is used.
 Provinces of Algeria
 Provinces of Oman
 Regions of Mauritania
 States of Sudan
 Governorates of Tunisia

The governorates of Iraq (muhafazah) are sometimes translated as provinces, in contrast to official Iraqi documents and the general use for other Arab countries. This conflicts somehow with the general translation for muhafazah (governorate) and wilāyah (province).

China
In the ethnically-diverse Xinjiang region of Northwest China, the seven undifferentiated prefectures proper (that is, not prefecture-level cities, autonomous prefectures, etc.) are translated into the Uygur language as Vilayiti. For the other, more numerous types of administrative divisions in Xinjiang, however, Uygur uses Russian loanwords like oblasti or rayoni, in common with other Xinjiang languages like Kazakh.

Kenya and Tanzania
In Kenya, the term wilaya is a Swahili term which refers to the administrative districts into which provinces are divided.
 Districts of Kenya
 Districts of Tanzania

Southeast Asia
In Malay (both in Malaysian and Indonesian standards) and Tausug, wilayah or wilāya is a general word meaning "territory", "area" or "region".

In Malaysia, the term
 Wilayah Persekutuan, often shortened to "Wilayah" in colloquial speech, refers to the three federal territories under direct control of the federal government: Kuala Lumpur, Labuan and Putrajaya.
 Wilayah Ekonomi Pantai Timur, is translated as East Coast Economic Region

In the Philippines, the term
 Wilāya sin Lupa' Sūg refers to the province of Sulu, Philippines.

Ottoman Empire

Traditionally the provinces of the Ottoman Empire were known as eyâlets, but beginning in 1864, they were gradually restructured as smaller vilâyets—the Turkish pronunciation of the Arabic word wilāyah. Most were subdivided into sanjaks.

The current provinces of Turkey are called il in Turkish.

DAESH 
The territory under the governance of the Islamic State (ISIS) is referred to them as officially being divided into wilayah, often translated into English as "province". An example is Islamic State – Khorasan Province.

Central Asia and Caucasus
The Persian word for province (velâyat) is still used in several similar forms in Central Asian countries:
 Regions of Turkmenistan (singular: welaýat, plural: welaýatlar), subdivided into districts
 Regions of Uzbekistan (singular: viloyat, plural: viloyatlar), subdivided into districts

During the Soviet period the divisions of Tajikistan, Turkmenistan and Uzbekistan were called oblasts and raions, using Russian terminology.

In the Tsez language, the districts of Dagestan are also referred to as "вилайат" (wilayat), plural "вилайатйоби" (wilayatyobi). But the term "район" (rayon), plural "районйаби" (rayonyabi) is also used.

Caucasus Emirate, a self-proclaimed successor state to the unrecognized Chechen Republic of Ichkeria, is divided into vilayats.

South Asia
In Urdu, the term Vilayat is used to refer to any foreign country. As an adjective Vilayati is used to indicate an imported article or good. In Bengali and Assamese, the term is bilat and bilati (archaic bilaiti), referring exclusively to Britain and British-made. The British slang term blighty derives from this word, via the fact that the foreign British were referred to using this word during the time of the British Raj.

See also
Vilayet

References

Arabic words and phrases
Types of administrative division
Malay language